Cryptochrysis is a formerly recognized genus of cryptomonads first proposed by Adolf Pascher in 1911. He initially treated it as the sole genus in family Cryptochrysidaceae, but later treated it as a member of the Cryptochrysideae subfamily of Cryptomonadaceae, along with Rhodomonas, Chroomonas, and Cyanomonas. In 1967, R.W. Butcher relegated the group to a subgenus within Chroomonas.

It is now regarded as paraphyletic, with its species now various reassigned into Pyrenomonas and Rhinomonas since 1988.

Species
 Cryptochrysis amoeboidea Pascher 1917
 Cryptochrysis atlantica Lackey 1940
 Cryptochrysis carinata Czosnowski 1948
 Cryptochrysis commutata Pascher 1911
 Cryptochrysis fulva 
 Cryptochrysis gigas Pascher 1917
 Cryptochrysis lateralis 
 Cryptochrysis magna Kufferath 1942
 Cryptochrysis minor Nygaard 1950
 Cryptochrysis minutissima 
 Cryptochrysis ovalis Petersen & Hansen 1961
 Cryptochrysis pochmannii Huber-Pestalozzi 1950
 Cryptochrysis polychrysis Pascher 1913
 Cryptochrysis rubens 
 Cryptochrysis virescens

References 

Cryptomonad genera